Renata Zarazúa Ruckstuhl (born 30 September 1997) is a Mexican tennis player. She reached a best singles ranking of world No. 117 in September 2021, and she peaked at No. 135 in the doubles rankings on 8 October 2018. Zarazúa made her WTA Tour singles debut at the 2016 Brasil Cup, where she reached the main draw through qualifying. On the ITF Circuit, she has won two titles in singles and sixteen titles in doubles. On the WTA Tour, her biggest result to date was reaching the semifinals of the 2020 Mexican Open, where she defeated former No. 3, Sloane Stephens, in the first round. In 2020, she qualified for the main draw of the French Open, her Grand Slam debut. She was the first Mexican female tennis player to compete in the main draw of a Grand Slam championship since 2000.

Playing for Mexico Fed Cup team, Zarazúa has a win–loss record of 14–11 in Fed Cup competition (as of December 2022).

Early life and background
Zarazúa was born on 30 September 1997 to Jose Luis and Alejandra in Mexico City. She also has an older brother named Patricio, who is a former college tennis player for Palm Beach Atlantic University. Her great-uncle Vicente Zarazúa, a Mexican pro tennis player, participated in 16 Davis Cup ties for Mexico and claimed gold medals in exhibition doubles at the 1968 Olympic Games in Mexico City. During an interview at the 2020 French Open, Zarazúa stated that Simona Halep is the player she admires the most.

Tennis career
In February 2018 at the Mexican Open, she defeated Kristýna Plíšková to reach the round of 16.

In late February 2020, Zarazúa received a wildcard to play again at the Mexican Open in Acapulco, where she reached her first WTA Tour singles semifinal. In the first round, she upset top-seeded Sloane Stephens.

In September 2020, she qualified for the main draw of the French Open, her first appearance at a Grand Slam tournament. Zarazúa was the first Mexican woman in a main draw of a major in 20 years. She lost in the second round to third-seeded Elina Svitolina.

In 2021, she qualified for the Olympic Games in singles and in doubles, partnering Giuliana Olmos both making their Olympics debut.

Performance timelines

Only main-draw results in WTA Tour, Grand Slam tournaments, Fed Cup/Billie Jean King Cup and Olympic Games are included in win–loss records.

Singles
Current through the 2022 Copa Colsanitas.

WTA Challenger finals

Singles: 1 (runner-up)

ITF Circuit finals

Singles: 10 (3 titles, 7 runner–ups)

Doubles: 26 (16 titles, 10 runner–ups)

Notes

References

External links
 
 
 

1997 births
Living people
Tennis players from Mexico City
Mexican female tennis players
Tennis players at the 2014 Summer Youth Olympics
Central American and Caribbean Games gold medalists for Mexico
Competitors at the 2014 Central American and Caribbean Games
Tennis players at the 2019 Pan American Games
Central American and Caribbean Games medalists in tennis
Pan American Games competitors for Mexico
Olympic tennis players of Mexico
Tennis players at the 2020 Summer Olympics
21st-century Mexican women